The Jeanneau Flirt is a French trailerable sailboat that was designed by the Jeanneau Design Office, as a pocket cruiser and first built in 1976.

Production
The design was built by Jeanneau in France, from 1976 until 1984, with 1743 boats completed, but it is now out of production.

Design
The Flirt is a recreational keelboat, built predominantly of fiberglass, with wood trim. It has a 7/8 fractional sloop rig, with a deck-stepped mast, one set of spreaders and aluminum spars with stainless steel wire rigging. The hull has a raked stem, a plumb transom, a transom-hung rudder controlled by a tiller and a fixed fin keel or stub keel and centerboard.

The boat is fitted with either an optional inboard engine powering a saildrive or a small  outboard motor for docking and maneuvering.

The design has sleeping accommodation for four people, with a truncated double "V"-berth in the bow cabin and two straight settee berth in the main cabin. The galley is located in the starboard bow. The galley is equipped with a single-burner stove and an icebox.

Variants
Flirt fin keel
This fixed keel model displaces  and carries  of ballast.
Flirt keel and centerboard
This stub keel and centerboard model displaces  and carries  of ballast.

See also
List of sailing boat types

References

External links

Keelboats
1970s sailboat type designs
Sailing yachts
Trailer sailers
Sailboat type designs by Jeanneau Design Office
Sailboat types built by Jeanneau